United States gubernatorial elections were held in 1940, in 34 states, concurrent with the House, Senate elections and presidential election, on November 5, 1940 (September 9 in Maine).

This was the last time Georgia elected its governors to 2-year terms, switching to 4-years from the 1942 election.

Results

See also 
1940 United States elections
1940 United States presidential election
1940 United States Senate elections
1940 United States House of Representatives elections

References 

 
Gubernatorial
November 1940 events